Jabal el-Hussein camp is one of the 10 officially recognized UNRWA Palestinian refugee camps in Jordan. It is located outside of the Abdali area district of Amman.

It is one of the first four camps in Jordan founded to accommodate refugees from the 1948 Palestinian exodus.

References

Palestinian refugee camps in Jordan
1952 establishments in Jordan
Populated places in Amman Governorate